Dana College was a private college in Blair, Nebraska. Its rural 150-acre (607,000 m²) campus is approximately 26 miles (40 km) northwest of Omaha and overlooks a portion of the Missouri River Valley. The campus was planned to be purchased by Midland University, which expressed its intention to re-open the campus in 2015 or 2016, but dropped plans in early 2016.

The name "Dana" is the poetic variant of "Denmark". The college was founded in 1884 by Danish pioneers.

Introduction
The student body was taught by 45 professors and eight non-doctorate instructors, resulting in an average teacher-student ratio of 1:12.

The college offered on-campus housing in five residence halls and contractually maintained off-campus apartments for married or non-traditional students. Campus life fostered by an active student government and many student organizations. There were no fraternities and sororities.

History
The Danish Evangelical Lutheran Association in America (or Blair Church) was formed in 1884 by a group of Danish members who left the Conference of the Norwegian-Danish Evangelical Lutheran Church of America. Many Blair Church pastors were supportive of the Inner Mission.

The Danish Evangelical Lutheran Church in North America (or North Church) was formed in 1894 when seminary professor P. S. Vig, along with a number of pastor and congregations, left the Danish Evangelical Lutheran Church in America over theological differences.

In 1896, two small groups of Danish Lutherans in America – known as the Blair Church and the North Church – came together to form the United Danish Evangelical Lutheran Church (commonly known as the United Church). This church body was a part of the Danish Lutheran "Inner Mission" movement, which supported a revival of religious practice based on the Bible and orthodox Lutheran teachings. Its members strongly opposed the liberalizing influence of Danish theologian N. F. S. Grundtvig, who had supported the realization of religious expression through sacramental and congregational practices.

Led by Peter Sørensen Vig and C. X. Hansen, one of the United Church's first priorities was to establish an educational system. Elk Horn Højskole in Elk Horn, Iowa, had been founded in 1878 as the first Danish folk school in America. In 1894, Pastor Kristian Anker, then owner and principal of the Elk Horn Højskole, sold it to the newly formed Danish Lutheran Church in North America for use as a seminary and college. When the North Church merged with the Blair Church in 1896, the seminary was consolidated with Trinity Seminary in Blair, Nebraska.

When the Dana School was founded, part of its purpose was to be a pre-seminary school for those preparing for ministry in the Lutheran church. Many of Dana's early graduates went on to study at Trinity Seminary. For many years, Dana and Trinity shared faculty, administrators, staff, and presidents. This relationship ended in 1956 when Trinity Seminary merged with Wartburg Theological Seminary in Dubuque, Iowa.

The Dana School was begun as preparatory school. By the early 1910s – in cooperation with the University of Nebraska – the Dana School was awarding associate degrees. In the 1930s Dana College became an accredited four-year school and began awarding bachelor's degrees.

Closure
The institution faced significant, on-going financial challenges in the 2000s. Dana College reported that its deficit rose from $7,170,000 USD in 2005 to more than $12,550,000 USD in 2009. The Dana College Board of Regents attempted to convince major donors to make contributions to the college. Yet Dana College was unable to attract the donations to erase the deficit and fund on-going operations. This lack of financial support for the institution was because of two major problems: The global financial crisis which resulted in the Great Recession of 2008 meant that several prospective donors were unable and/or unwilling to contribute, coupled with a lack of a "big grand vision for what Dana could become", according to one Regent who served during that period.

In 2010, the Dana College Board of Regents made a decision to structure an agreement to sell Dana College to an investment group, Dana Education Corporation. The investment group proposed to transform Dana into a for-profit institution with a focus on "doubling enrollment, aggressively marketing the school and building Dana's study abroad program".

However, this proposed change of control was not accepted by the Higher Learning Commission of the North Central Association of Colleges and Schools.

The sale of Dana College to the investment group collapsed. On June 30, 2010, the Dana College Board of Regents elected to cease operations, citing a multimillion-dollar deficit.

On July 14, 2010, the Dana College Board of Regents wrote in a letter to alumni and supporters "We are firm in our belief that politics, not substance and reason, drove the ultimate decision." Attempts made by students, faculty, staff, alumni and other supporters of Dana College to influence the Higher Learning Commission to reverse its decision failed.

Students were offered the ability to transfer the University of Nebraska at Omaha and Grand View University in Iowa, through formal teach-out plans.

Midland University of Fremont, Nebraska, allowed all former Dana College students to transfer all Dana college credits, honored all Dana academic, athletic and need-based scholarships and grants, and waived enrollment deposits for Dana students. Of the roughly 600 Dana students, approximately 275 enrolled at Midland in the fall of 2010.

In 2013, Midland University, experiencing increasing enrollment and considering expansion, leased the Dana campus with the option of purchasing it; the land was purchased instead by Frank Krejci, an Omaha developer, for $3.5 million, who then donated it to Ed Shada, an Omaha banker, to lead redevelopment of the campus. In 2016, Midland announced that it would not re-open the Dana campus, but would concentrate its expansion efforts in Fremont and Omaha. According to a Midland press release, high maintenance costs and "a complicated path to accreditation" dissuaded them from carrying through their plans for the Blair site.

The land was to become the new home of Omaha's Grace University in 2018, after the school sold a large part of their campus to Omaha Public Schools. However, Grace too announced their folding at the end of the 2017–18 academic year and the move to Blair did not occur. In 2018, alumni and friends of Grace founded Charis University with the intent of occupying the Dana campus and becoming a spiritual successor to Grace.

Presidents
The Presidents of Dana College were:

 Kristian Anker (1902–1905)
 C. X. Hansen (1908–1914, 1919–1925, 1936–1938)
 Erland Nelson (1931–1936)
 Lawrence Siersbeck (1938–1944)
 R. E. Morton (1944–1956)
 C. C. Madsen (1956–1971)
 Earl R. Mezoff (1971–1978)
 James Kallas (1978–1985)
 Myrvin Christopherson (1986–2005)
 Janet Philipp (2005–2010)

Campus
The campus has  of space.

Rasmussen Hall housed first and second year students. It was coed, with each wing or each floor housing a sex. Holling Hall housed first and second year students. Blair Hall housed upperclassmen, and first year students were not eligible to live there. Previously Mickelsen Hall housed both men and women on different floors. In the  summer of 2007 Mickelsen was renovated so it housed upperclassmen women. In the fall of 2006 the school opened the Suite-Style Apartments for third and fourth year students.

The university maintained Omaha Village Apartments, for married and non-traditional students. Omaha Village had one and two bedroom apartments.

Dana College expected its students to live on campus for all of their years. Any students wishing to live off campus were required to gain approval.

The campus was listed on the National Register of Historic Places in 2021.

Notable alumni
 Matty Lewis (1998), co-lead singer of the La Habra, CA based punk rock band Zebrahead
 Benson Henderson (2006), current mixed martial artist, former Bellator MMA and UFC Lightweight Champion
 Richard A. Jensen, theologian, professor and author
 Paul Simon, U.S. Senator from Illinois. He attended but did not graduate.

Athletics
The Dana athletic teams were called the Vikings. The college was a member of the National Association of Intercollegiate Athletics (NAIA), primarily competing in the Great Plains Athletic Conference (GPAC) from 1969–70 to 2009–10.

Dana competed in 18 intercollegiate varsity sports: Men's sports included baseball, basketball, cross country, football, golf, soccer, track & field and wrestling; while women's sports included basketball, cheerleading, cross country, dance, golf, lacrosse, soccer, softball, track & field and volleyball.

Athletic director
Former pro wrestler Bill Danenhauer was the last athletic director.

Backlash
In January 2009, it considered changing conference affiliations; however, outcry from alumni caused the school to rethink its position.

Clubs & intramurals
The college also had a number of intramural and club sports programs below the varsity level, operating independently of the athletic department.

References

On the history of Dana College and Trinity Seminary:
Christensen, William E.  Saga of the Tower: A History of Dana College and Trinity Seminary.  Blair, Nebraska: Lutheran Publishing House, 1959.
Petersen, Peter L.  A Place Called Dana: The Centennial History of Trinity Seminary and Dana College.  Blair, Nebraska: Dana College, 1984

On the history of the Danish Lutherans in America:
Jensen, John M.  The United Evangelical Lutheran Church: An Interpretation.  Minneapolis: Augsburg Publishing House, 1964.
Nyholm, Paul C.  The Americanization of the Danish Lutheran Churches in America: A Study in Immigrant History.  Minneapolis: Augsburg, 1963.

External links

  (archive)
 Official athletics website 

 
Defunct private universities and colleges in Nebraska
Educational institutions established in 1884
Educational institutions disestablished in 2010
Danish-American culture in Nebraska
Liberal arts colleges in Nebraska
1884 establishments in Nebraska 
2010 disestablishments in Nebraska
National Register of Historic Places in Washington County, Nebraska